Brøndby Kommune, a municipality in the former Copenhagen County (now Region Hovedstaden), is on the east coast of the island of Zealand (Sjælland) in eastern Denmark. Its mayor Kent Max Magelund, a member of the Social Democrats (Socialdemokraterne) political party.

The site of its municipal council is the town of Brøndbyvester. Neighboring municipalities are Hvidovre to the east, Rødovre to the north, Glostrup to the north, Albertslund to the northwest, and Vallensbæk to the west.  To the south is Køge Bay (Køge Bugt).

The geography of Brøndby municipality was not affected by the nationwide Kommunalreformen ("The Municipality Reform" of 2007) on 1 January 2007.

The 'towns' of Brøndby 
Brøndby consists of three cities: Brøndbyvester (west), Brøndbyøster (east) and to the south Brøndby Strand.

Brøndbyvester is the "original" Brøndby and has several old farmhouses, but mostly consists of single family houses - this is a typical middle-class Danish suburb. Brøndby's name in Danish combines both "water well" and "town".

Brøndbyøster is east of the big intersection that parts the three different Brøndbys. (Brøndby Strand Projects 93), this part of the city has many older people and immigrants.

Brøndby Strand is a mix of those two cities. There are lot of single-family houses and 12 high-rise residential estates.  It is the only area in Denmark where more than 50 percent of the population aren't Danish-born, nor of Danish descent. These four neighborhoods are also known as the Southside or Southcoast Copenhagen.

Brøndby is the home of Brøndby IF, a football club.

Politics

Municipal council
Brøndby's municipal council consists of 19 members, elected every four years.

Below are the municipal councils elected since the Municipal Reform of 2007.

Twin towns – sister cities

Brøndby is twinned with:
 Botkyrka, Sweden
 Dorogomilovo (Moscow), Russia

 Stange, Norway
 Steglitz-Zehlendorf (Berlin), Germany

Notable people

See also
Brøndbyøster station
Brøndby Strand station

References 

 Municipal statistics: NetBorger Kommunefakta, delivered from KMD aka Kommunedata (Municipal Data)
 Municipal mergers and neighbors: Eniro new municipalities map

External links

Municipality's official website
Krak searchable/printable maps
Krak map of Brøndby 

 
Municipalities in the Capital Region of Denmark
Municipalities of Denmark
Copenhagen metropolitan area